Reserection is an extended play (EP) by English alternative dance band Saint Etienne and French singer Étienne Daho, under the collective name St. Etienne Daho. It was released on 29 September 1995 by Virgin Records.

The title is a portmanteau of the words resurrection and erection, with the former referring to rumours at the time that Daho was HIV-positive, or even that he had already died. The opening track, "Reserection", puts the matter to rest as Daho states that he will rise from his "cendres fiction" ("fictitious ashes") "encore et encore" ("again and again").

The only English song on the EP, "Accident", is a reworked version of Daho's 1984 French-language single "Week-end à Rome", with original English lyrics. Daho's speech from "Reserection" is also reprised within the song. "Jungle Pulse", "X Amours", and "Le Baiser français" are French-language reworkings of Saint Etienne's "Filthy", "Paper", and "Suburban Autumn Lieutenant", respectively.

Originally, the EP's sole single was "Jungle Pulse", but Eurodance producer Steve Rodway subsequently produced a remix of "Accident" that became "He's on the Phone", released as the single from Saint Etienne's first greatest hits compilation, Too Young to Die: Singles 1990–1995.

The band later worked with Daho on the single "Le Premier Jour", from his greatest hits compilation Singles.

Track listing

Charts

Release history

References

1995 EPs
Collaborative albums
Étienne Daho albums
French-language EPs
Saint Etienne (band) albums
Virgin Records EPs